NGC 4559 (also known as Caldwell 36) is an intermediate spiral galaxy with a weak inner ring structure in the constellation Coma Berenices. Distance estimates for NGC 4559 range from about 28 million light-years to 31 million light-years, averaging about 29 million light-years.

NGC 4559 is a member of the Coma I Group.

Two supernovae have been recorded in NGC 4559, A Type II-L supernova in 1941 (SN 1941A) and an unclassified supernova event in 2019.

The luminous blue variable AT2016blu in NGC 4559 experiences repeated supernova-like outbursts. First observed in January 2012, it burst out again in 2014, 2016, 2017, 2018, 2019, 2020 and 2021.

See also
 Messier 99 – a similar spiral galaxy

Gallery

References

External links
 

Intermediate spiral galaxies
Coma Berenices
4559
07766
42002
036b
Coma I Group